The Edward Jenner Institute for Vaccine Research (EJIVR) was an independent research institute named after Edward Jenner, the inventor of vaccination. It was co-located with the Compton Laboratory of the Institute for Animal Health on a campus in the village of Compton in Berkshire, England. After occupying temporary laboratory space at the Institute for Animal Health from 1996, the Institute moved to a newly completed laboratory building in 1998. Funding of the Institute continued until October 2005 when it was closed.

Jenner Institute

A successor institute, formed by a partnership between the University of Oxford and the UK Institute for Animal Health, was established in November 2005. This Jenner Institute is headquartered in Oxford on the Old Road Campus and is supported by a specific charity, the Jenner Vaccine Foundation.

References

Research institutes established in 1996
Research institutes disestablished in 2005
Research institutes in Berkshire
Former research institutes
Medical research institutes in the United Kingdom
Vaccination-related organizations